Buena Vida is a 2015 album by Diego Torres. It earned Torres a Grammy Award nomination for Best Latin Pop Album. It was also nominated Album of the Year and Best Traditional Pop Vocal Album at the 17th Annual Latin Grammy Awards.

References

2015 albums
Diego Torres albums